Sciadocephala is a genus of Latin American plants in the tribe Eupatorieae within the family Asteraceae.

 Species
 Sciadocephala amazonica R.M.King & H.Rob. - Colombia, Ecuador
 Sciadocephala asplundii R.M.King & H.Rob. - Ecuador
 Sciadocephala dressleri R.M.King & H.Rob. - Panamá, Ecuador
 Sciadocephala pakaraimae (Maguire & Wurdack) R.M.King & H.Rob. - Guyana
 Sciadocephala schultze-rhonhofiae Mattf. - Ecuador, Peru

References

Eupatorieae
Asteraceae genera
Taxonomy articles created by Polbot